JS Shimakaze (DDG-172/TV-3521) is the second ship of the  guided missile destroyers built for the Japan Maritime Self-Defense Force (JMSDF). The ship was reclassified as training ship in 2021.

Construction and career 
Shimakaze was laid down on the 13 January 1985 at Mitsubishi Heavy Industries shipyard in Nagasaki. She was launched on 30 January 1987, and commissioned on 23 March 1988.

,  and Shimakaze participated in a bilateral exercise between the Royal Canadian Navy and Japan Maritime Self-Defense Force on 16 October 2019.

On 30 March 2020, Shimakaze was damaged in a collision with a Chinese fishing vessel in the East China Sea.

Shimakaze was converted to training ship and redesignated as TV-3521 on 19 March 2021.

See also
List of active Japan Maritime Self-Defense Force ships

References

External links

 Military Factory

1987 ships
Hatakaze-class destroyers
Ships built by Mitsubishi Heavy Industries
Training ships of the Japan Maritime Self-Defense Force